Dmitry Nikolayevich Barsuk (born 20 January 1980) is a Russian beach volleyball player. He made an Olympic debut at the 2008 Summer Olympics in Beijing, China.

In August 2008 Barsuk and team mate Igor Kolodinsky won their first Swatch FIVB World Tour gold medal at the A1 Beach Volleyball Grand Slam in Klagenfurt, Austria.

Sponsors
 Swatch

References
 Dmitri Barsouk at the Beach Volleyball Database

1980 births
Living people
Russian beach volleyball players
Men's beach volleyball players
Beach volleyball players at the 2008 Summer Olympics
Beach volleyball players at the 2016 Summer Olympics
Olympic beach volleyball players of Russia
People from Armavir, Russia
Beach volleyball players at the 2015 European Games
European Games silver medalists for Russia
European Games medalists in beach volleyball
Sportspeople from Krasnodar Krai